Bagansky District is an administrative and municipal district (raion), one of the thirty in Novosibirsk Oblast, Russia. It is located in the southwest of the oblast. Its administrative center is the rural locality (a selo) of Bagan. Population: 16,627 (2010 Census);  The population of Bagan accounts for 33.1% of the district's total population.

References

Notes

Sources

Districts of Novosibirsk Oblast